Arabic is a Unicode block, containing the standard letters and the most common diacritics of the Arabic script, and the Arabic-Indic digits.

Block

History
The following Unicode-related documents record the purpose and process of defining specific characters in the Arabic block:

References 

Unicode blocks